Lantanophaga anellatus is a moth of the family Pterophoridae. It is known from India (Punjab and Himachal Pradesh).

The wingspan is 12–13 mm.

References

Platyptiliini
Moths of Asia
Moths described in 2003